Puriteen is a portmanteau of "puritan" and "teenager" used to describe a young person, typically a teenager, who is prudish and uncomfortable about sexual content on the internet. Many are anti-porn but are not typically anti-LGBTQ.

Young people are the least sexually active generation in decades. Some argue this is down to greater awareness about consent and trauma as a result of the Me Too movement and increased familiarity with porn leading to increased opposition to it due to increased understanding of it.

Some are critical of the term puriteen, arguing that most teenagers have much more nuanced beliefs on sex, and that only a minority are as prudish as the term puriteen implies.

References

2021 neologisms
Sex- and gender-related slurs
Pejorative terms for people